Denison is both a surname and a masculine given name. Notable people with the name include:

Surname:
Albert Denison, 1st Baron Londesborough (1805–1860), British Liberal Party politician and diplomat, known as Lord Albert Conyngham
Augusta Elizabeth Denison, wife of Arthur Wrottesley, 3rd Baron Wrottesley
Anthony Denison (born 1949), American actor
Brianna Denison (1988–2008), American college student and murder victim
Daniel Denison (golfer), English professional golfer
Daniel R. Denison, professor of management and organization
Duane Denison (born 1959), American musician and founding member of The Jesus Lizard, and Tomahawk (band)
Edmund Denison, chairman of the Great Northern Railway (Great Britain)
Edward Denison (philanthropist) (1840–1870), English philanthropist
Edward Denison (bishop) (1801–1854), English bishop
Edward E. Denison (1873–1953), American congressman
Edward Fulton Denison (1915–1992), American economist
Ellery Denison (1900–1989), philatelist of Maryland
Evelyn Denison (1800–1873), statesman, Speaker of the British House of Commons from 1857 to 1872
Francis Napier Denison (1866–1946), Canadian meteorologist, inventor, seismologist, and astronomer
George Denison, several people
Hugh Denison (1865–1940), Australian businessman, born Hugh Robert Dixson
John G. Denison, Former chairman of ATA Airlines and Global Aero Logistics
Joseph Denison (banker) (1726–1806), English banker
Joseph Denison (pastor) (1815–1900), American Methodist pastor
Mark R. Denison (born 1955), American physician and medical researcher on coronaviruses
Oswald Denison, New Zealand rower
Sean Denison (born 1985), Canadian basketball player
Robert Denison (1697–1765), soldier and political figure in Connecticut and Nova Scotia
Walter Denison, New Zealand lawn bowler
William Denison (1804–1871), Lieutenant Governor of Van Diemen's Land, 1847–1855, and Governor of New South Wales, 1855–1861

Given name:
Denison Bollay (born 1952), software engineer
Denison Cabral (born 1974), midfielder for the Baltimore Blast
Denison Miller (1860–1923), first governor of the Commonwealth Bank of Australia
Denison Olmsted (1791–1859), American physicist and astronomer
Denison Witmer, indie singer-songwriter

See also
Dennison (surname)

Masculine given names